Zoot may refer to:

 Zoot Comics, a 1946–1948 Fox Features Syndicate comic book featuring Rulah, Jungle Goddess
 Zoot (band), an Australian pop group active 1965–1971
 Zoot!, a 1956 album by saxophonist Zoot Sims 
 Zoot suit, a style of clothing first popular in the 1930s and 1940s
 Zoot, a game on the MSX platform, released by Bug Byte software in 1986

People
 Zoot Sims (born John Haley Sims; 1925–1985), American jazz saxophonist
 Zoot Money (born George Bruno Money, 1942), British vocalist, keyboardist and actor

Characters
 Zoot, a balding saxophone player character in the fictional Muppet band Dr. Teeth and The Electric Mayhem
 Zoot, a character in the film Monty Python and the Holy Grail
 Zoot, a synthetic suit in My Favorite Martian
 Zoot, a character in the webcomic Loxie & Zoot
 Zoot, a character in the series The Tribe

See also
 Zoot Suit (disambiguation)